The NR postcode area, also known as the Norwich postcode area, is a group of 35 postcode districts in the east of England, within 16 post towns. These cover central and eastern Norfolk (including Norwich, Great Yarmouth, Attleborough, Wymondham, Dereham, Fakenham, Walsingham, Wells-next-the-Sea, Melton Constable, Holt, Sheringham, Cromer and North Walsham) and part of north-east Suffolk (including Lowestoft, Beccles and Bungay).



Coverage
The approximate coverage of the postcode districts:

|-
! NR1
| NORWICH
| Thorpe Hamlet, Lakenham, (parts of) City Centre, areas close to Thorpe Road Mail Centre
| Norwich
|-
! NR2
| NORWICH
| Parts of Eaton, parts of Earlham, western and south-western parts of Norwich and parts of the city centre
| Norwich
|-
! NR3
| NORWICH
| N part of Norwich, within the ring-road: Mile Cross, New Catton
| Norwich, Broadland
|-
! NR4
| NORWICH
| Suburbs and villages W and SW of Norwich: Eaton, Tuckswood, Cringleford, Colney, Keswick
| South Norfolk
|-
! NR5
| NORWICH
| W and NW suburbs of Norwich: Bowthorpe, Costessey, Earlham
| Norwich, South Norfolk
|-
! NR6
| NORWICH
| N and NW suburbs of Norwich: Old Catton, Hellesdon
| Norwich, Broadland
|-
! NR7
| NORWICH
| E and SE suburbs of Norwich: Sprowston, Thorpe St. Andrew, Heartsease
| Norwich, Broadland
|-
! NR8
| NORWICH
| Suburbs and villages NW of Norwich: Drayton, Taverham, Ringland
| Broadland, South Norfolk
|-
! NR9
| NORWICH
| Villages W and NW of Norwich: Barford, Bawburgh, Hethersett, Honingham, Lenwade, Little Melton, Lyng, Marlingford and Colton, Weston Longville
| Broadland, South Norfolk
|-
! NR10
| NORWICH
| Villages and towns N and NW of Norwich: Pettywell, Reepham, Hevingham, Stratton Strawless, Horsham St Faith
| Broadland, South Norfolk
|-
! NR11
| NORWICH
| Alby with Thwaite, Aldborough, Aylmerton, Aylsham, Banningham, Blickling, East Beckham, Little Barningham, Hanworth, North Barningham, Roughton, Felbrigg, Gimingham, Ingworth, Matlask, Mundesley, Southrepps, Wickmere
| North Norfolk, Broadland
|-
! NR12
| NORWICH
| Bacton, Brumstead, Coltishall, East Ruston, Hickling, Ingham, Lessingham, Sloley, Stalham, Tunstead, Wroxham
| North Norfolk
|-
! NR13
| NORWICH
| Towns and villages E of Norwich: Acle, Brundall, Reedham, Rackheath, Salhouse
| Broadland
|-
! NR14
| NORWICH
| Suburbs and villages SE of Norwich: Loddon, Poringland, Trowse, Haddiscoe
| South Norfolk
|-
! NR15
| NORWICH
| Long Stratton
| South Norfolk
|-
! NR16
| NORWICH
| Banham, Larling, New Buckenham
| Breckland
|-
! NR17
| ATTLEBOROUGH
| Little & Great Ellingham, Old Buckenham
| Breckland
|-
! style="background:#FFFFFF;"|NR18
| style="background:#FFFFFF;"|NORWICH
| style="background:#FFFFFF;"|
| style="background:#FFFFFF;"|non-geographic
|-
! NR18
| WYMONDHAM
| Wymondham
| South Norfolk
|-
! style="background:#FFFFFF;"|NR19
| style="background:#FFFFFF;"|NORWICH
| style="background:#FFFFFF;"|
| style="background:#FFFFFF;"|non-geographic
|-
! NR19
| DEREHAM
| Dereham
| Breckland
|-
! NR20
| DEREHAM
| Villages N and E of Dereham: Bawdeswell, Bylaugh, Elsing, Foxley, Foulsham, Gressenhall, Guestwick, Hockering, Mattishall, Whissonsett, Nethergate, North Elmham, Swanton Morley, Themelthorpe
| Breckland
|-
! NR21
| FAKENHAM
| Barsham, Binham, Fakenham, Fulmodeston, South Raynham, East Raynham, West Raynham, Hempton, Helhoughton, Hindringham, Gunthorpe, Tatterford, Toftrees
| North Norfolk, King's Lynn and West Norfolk
|-
! NR22
| WALSINGHAM
| Walsingham, Houghton St Giles, North Barsham
| North Norfolk, King's Lynn and West Norfolk
|-
! NR23
| WELLS-NEXT-THE-SEA
| Quarles, Warham, Wells-next-the-Sea, Wighton
| North Norfolk, King's Lynn and West Norfolk
|-
! NR24
| MELTON CONSTABLE
|Stody, Briston, Briningham, Brinton, Edgefield, Sharrington, Melton Constable, Plumstead, Swanton Novers 
| North Norfolk
|-
! NR25
| HOLT
| Kelling, Baconsthorpe, Blakeney, Bodham, Cley next the Sea, Edgfield, Hempstead, High Kelling, Hunworth Langham, Letheringsett, Glandford, Weybourne, West Beckham, Salthouse
| North Norfolk
|-
! style="background:#FFFFFF;"|NR26
| style="background:#FFFFFF;"|NORWICH
| style="background:#FFFFFF;"|
| style="background:#FFFFFF;"|non-geographic
|-
! NR26
| SHERINGHAM
| Beeston Regis, Upper Sheringham
| North Norfolk
|-
! NR27
| CROMER
|Cromer, East Runton, West Runton, Frogshall, Trimingham, Northrepps, Overstrand 
| North Norfolk
|-
! NR28
| NORTH WALSHAM
| Antingham, Crostwight, Honing, Knapton, Trunch, Paston, Ridlington 
| North Norfolk
|-
! NR29
| GREAT YARMOUTH
| Catfield, Hemsby, Rollesby 
| Great Yarmouth, North Norfolk
|-
! NR30
| GREAT YARMOUTH
| Great Yarmouth, Caister-on-Sea, West Caister
| Great Yarmouth
|-
! NR31
| GREAT YARMOUTH
| Gorleston-on-Sea, Bradwell
| Great Yarmouth
|-
! NR32
| LOWESTOFT
| North Lowestoft
| East Suffolk
|-
! NR33
| LOWESTOFT
| South Lowestoft 
| East Suffolk
|-
! NR34
| BECCLES
| Beccles, Worlingham, Gillingham, Stockton
| East Suffolk, South Norfolk
|-
! NR35
| BUNGAY
| Bungay, Topcroft, Flixton
| East Suffolk, South Norfolk
|-
! style="background:#FFFFFF;"|NR99
| style="background:#FFFFFF;"|NORWICH
| style="background:#FFFFFF;"|
| style="background:#FFFFFF;"|non-geographic
|-
|}

Map

See also
Postcode Address File
Extreme points of the United Kingdom
List of postcode areas in the United Kingdom

References

External links
Royal Mail's Postcode Address File
A quick introduction to Royal Mail's Postcode Address File (PAF)

Norwich
Postcode areas covering the East of England